Homer A. Stone (February 2, 1868 – August 30, 1938) was an American politician and farmer.

Born in the town of Fitchburg, Wisconsin, Stone graduated from Oregon High School in Oregon, Wisconsin and then took a short course in agriculture at University of Wisconsin. He was a farmer and was involved with a creamery, the fire insurance business, and the bank. Stone served on the school board and was the board clerk. In 1917, Stone served in the Wisconsin State Assembly and was a Republican. Stone died at his home in Fitchburg, Wisconsin after a long illness. He was buried at Prairie Mound Cemetery in Oregon, Wisconsin.

Notes

1868 births
1938 deaths
People from Fitchburg, Wisconsin
University of Wisconsin–Madison College of Agricultural and Life Sciences alumni
Businesspeople from Wisconsin
Farmers from Wisconsin
School board members in Wisconsin
Republican Party members of the Wisconsin State Assembly